Leutnant Arno Benzler (Cross of Distinction in War, Iron Cross) was a German First World War flying ace and aerial commander credited with nine confirmed aerial victories.<ref name=lines70>Above the Lines: The Aces and Fighter Units of the German Air Service, Naval Air Service and Flanders Marine Corps, 1914-1918''', p. 70.</ref>

World War I service
Benzler served with Jagdstaffel 32 from 14 February to 22 December 1917; he then transferred to Jagdstaffel 45. On 7 March 1918, he was appointed to temporary command of Jagdstaffel 65. At some point prior, on a now unknown date, Benzler had had his first confirmed victory. On 13 March 1918, he scored his second. On 16 March, he scored again. On 18 March, he transferred back to Jagdstaffel 45. While with them, he shot down an enemy observation balloon on 12 April 1918. On 27 May, he was appointed as Staffelführer of Jagdstaffel 60. He scored three times in June, on the 2nd, 4th, and 23rd. He rounded out his list with triumphs on 4 and 7 August 1918. He was wounded in action on 5 October 1918, but remained in command until the 11 November 1918 Armistice.

Decorations
Benzler's exploits earned him the rarely awarded Cross of Distinction in War, First Class, from the Grand Duchy of Mecklenburg-Strelitz, as well as the Iron Cross.

References
 Above the Lines: The Aces and Fighter Units of the German Air Service, Naval Air Service and Flanders Marine Corps, 1914-1918'' (1993). Norman L. R. Franks, Frank W. Bailey, Russell Guest. Grub Street. , .

External links
 The Aerodrome website @ http://www.theaerodrome.com/aces/germany/benzler.php contains a photo of Benzler, as well as a detailed list of his victories.
 Kriegsranglisten und -stammrollen des Königreichs Bayern, 1. Weltkrieg 1914-1918

Endnotes

German World War I flying aces
Luftstreitkräfte personnel
Recipients of the Iron Cross (1914), 1st class
Year of death missing
1895 births
Military personnel from Oberhausen